Nogometni klub Kovinar Maribor, commonly referred to as NK Kovinar Maribor or simply Kovinar, was a Slovenian football club from Maribor. The club was dissolved in 2006.

History
Kovinar Maribor was founded on 25 May 1947 and was located in the Tezno District of Maribor. During the booming economy in Maribor after the World War II, the club was financially supported by the local engineering industry company Metalna Maribor and the vehicle manufacturer TAM, both based in Tezno. Between the end of World War II in 1945 and the independence of Slovenia in 1991, Kovinar spent a total of 18 years in the Slovenian Republic Football League.

In 1961, they helped the newly formed NK Maribor by giving them some players and sports equipment. After the bribery scandal, when NK Maribor was relegated to the third Yugoslav division and many foreign players left the club, Kovinar again helped them by providing footballers. Unlike other major clubs based in the city, namely NK Maribor and Železničar Maribor, Kovinar never played in the Slovenian first division after Slovenia's independence; the highest level they reached was the second division during the 1991–92 season. The club was dissolved in June 2006 due to financial problems. In August 2006, a new phoenix club, named NK Tezno Maribor, was founded.

Zlatko Zahovič, who is considered one of the best Slovenian footballers of all time, was a member of the club's youth selections in the late 1980s, before joining Partizan from Belgrade.

Stadium
Kovinar Maribor played their home matches at Kovinar Stadium. The stadium can seat 200 spectators, while the overall capacity is around 1,000 (including standing areas). The stadium was once a speedway track.

References

Association football clubs established in 1947
Association football clubs disestablished in 2006
Football clubs in Yugoslavia
1947 establishments in Slovenia
Defunct football clubs in Slovenia
2006 disestablishments in Slovenia
Sport in Maribor